In cricket, a five-wicket haul (also known as a "five–for" or "fifer") refers to a bowler taking five or more wickets in a single innings. Described as a "notable" achievement by author M.A. Pervez, there have been only 11 instances of a bowler taking a five-wicket haul in Asia Cup games. The Asia Cup is a One Day International (ODI) tournament organised by the Asian Cricket Council, a subordinate of the International Cricket Council (ICC). Originally started as a biennial tournament in 1984, it has since been organised 14 times as of the latest edition in 2018.

The first five-wicket haul in the tournament was taken by India's Arshad Ayub in the 1988 tournamenthe took five wickets for 21 runs against Pakistan. In the 1995 edition, Pakistan's Aaqib Javed took five wickets for 19 runs against India. These two bowling figures feature in the "Top 100 ODI bowling performances of all time", a list compiled and released by the Wisden Cricketers' Almanack in 2002. No five-wicket hauls were taken in the 1990–91, 2000 and 2004 tournaments.

The Sri Lankans lead the list with seven five-wicket haulsAjantha Mendis and Lasith Malinga are the only bowlers to have taken more than one five-wicket haul in the tournament's history. The former achieved the feat two times, both in 2008, while the latter has done it three timesonce in the 2010 tournament and two times in 2014. Mendis' six wickets for 13 runs against India in the final of the 2008 edition is the best by any bowler across all tournaments.

Key
 Inn – The innings of the match in which the five-wicket haul was taken
 Overs – Overs bowled in the innings
 Runs – Runs conceded in the innings
 Wkts – Batsmen whose wickets were taken in the innings
 Econ – Runs conceded per over
 Won – The match was won by the bowler's team
 Lost – The match was lost by the bowler's team
 Tied – The match ended in a tie

Five-wicket hauls

Five-wicket hauls (T20I)

Notes

References

Bibliography

 

Five-wicket hauls
Asia Cup five-wicket hauls
Asia Cup